John Henshall was a footballer who played in the Football League for Burslem Port Vale at the start of the 20th century.

Career
Henshall played for Hanley Swifts before joining Burslem Port Vale in May 1900. His debut came in a 2–2 draw with Small Heath at the Athletic Ground on 1 September. He played four more Second Division games in that month, but was not utilized for the rest of the season and was instead released in the summer.

Career statistics
Source:

References

Year of birth missing
Year of death missing
English footballers
Association football forwards
Port Vale F.C. players
English Football League players